This page lists nationwide public opinion polls that have been conducted relating to the 2016 United States presidential election. The two major party candidates were chosen at the Democratic National Convention and Republican National Convention in July 2016.

Donald Trump won the general election of Tuesday, November 8, 2016, despite losing the popular vote while winning the electoral college. Most polls correctly predicted a popular vote victory for Clinton, but overestimated the size of her lead, with the result that Trump's electoral college victory was a surprise to analysts. Retrospective analyses differ as to why the polls and commentators interpreting them were unable to correctly forecast the result of the election.  Two daily tracking polls, the UPI/CVoter poll and the University of Southern California/Los Angeles Times poll were the only polls that often incorrectly predicted a Trump popular vote victory or showed a nearly tied election.

Aggregate polls
Poll numbers verified .

Individual polls

Two-way race

After convention nominations

Polls conducted in 2016

Polls conducted in 2015

Polls conducted in 2014

Polls conducted in 2013

Three-way race

Four-way race

Five-way race

Post-election analysis 
BBC News discussed whether polling should be abandoned due to its perceived failure. Forbes magazine contributor astrophysicist Ethan Siegel performed a scientific analysis and raised whether the statistical population sampled for the polling was inaccurate, and cited the cautionary adage "Garbage in, garbage out". He concluded there may have been sampling bias on the part of the pollsters. Siegel compared the 2016 election to the failure of prognosticator Arthur Henning in the "Dewey Defeats Truman" incident from the 1948 presidential election. Despite all this, however, nationwide polling was not far off from the actual popular vote result, and in fact very few states had results that deviated from the margin of error in the polling average. In a FiveThirtyEight article, Nate Silver defended the performance of the polls in 2016 as historically average, and argued that "Media organizations need to do a better job of informing their readers about the uncertainties associated with polling".

A particular case was the USC/Los Angeles Times Daybreak tracking poll, which was different from other polls as it had Donald Trump in the lead more often than not. The poll's findings caused skepticism, especially from other pollsters and media outlets, who have denounced it and often criticized the LA Times for running it. Before the election, Nate Silver deemed as positive the fact that the poll allowed people to assign themselves a probability of voting for either candidate instead of saying they're 100 percent sure, saying if people are "going to browbeat a pollster, [let's] do it to a pollster who is doing things cheaply—some of the robopolls qualify—and not one that’s trying to move the ball forward, like the LA Times poll." The LA Times concluded after the preliminary results of the election were published: "That doesn't necessarily mean that a poll conducted online, the way the Daybreak poll is, necessarily will be more accurate than polls conducted by phone. But it is yet another indication that polling needs more, diverse ways to look at public opinion, not fewer."

See also
General election polling
Nationwide opinion polling for the United States presidential election by demographics, 2016
Statewide opinion polling for the United States presidential election, 2016
International opinion polling for the United States presidential election, 2016

Democratic primary polling
Nationwide opinion polling for the Democratic Party 2016 presidential primaries
Statewide opinion polling for the Democratic Party presidential primaries, 2016

Republican primary polling
Nationwide opinion polling for the Republican Party 2016 presidential primaries
Statewide opinion polling for the Republican Party presidential primaries, 2016

After the election
Opinion polling on the Donald Trump administration

References

Opinion polling for the 2016 United States presidential election